CUMYL-PINACA (also known as SGT-24) is an indazole-3-carboxamide based synthetic cannabinoid. CUMYL-PINACA acts as a potent agonist for the cannabinoid receptors, with approximately 3x selectivity for CB1, having an EC50 of 0.15nM for human CB1 receptors and 0.41nM for human CB2 receptors. In its pure form, it is described as a sticky oil which can cause poisoning through transdermal exposure.

Legal status 

Sweden's public health agency suggested classifying CUMYL-PINACA as a hazardous substance, on November 10, 2014.

See also 
 5F-CUMYL-PINACA
 5F-SDB-006
 CUMYL-4CN-BINACA
 CUMYL-PICA
 CUMYL-THPINACA
 SDB-006
 MN-18
 NNE1

References 

Cannabinoids
Designer drugs
Indazolecarboxamides